Globoside alpha-1,3-N-acetylgalactosaminyltransferase 1 is an enzyme that in humans is encoded by the GBGT1 gene.

This gene encodes a member of the histo-blood group ABO gene family that encodes glycosyltransferases with related but distinct substrate specificity. This protein plays a role in synthesizing Forssman glycolipid (FG), a member of the globoseries glycolipid family. Human cells do not normally produce FG but produce the precursor glycolipids globotriaosylceramide and globoside. This protein may be involved in the tropism and binding of pathogenic organisms.

References

Further reading